The 1866 United States elections occurred in the middle of National Union/Democratic President Andrew Johnson's term, during the Third Party System and Reconstruction. Johnson had become president on April 15, 1865, upon the death of his predecessor, Abraham Lincoln. Members of the 40th United States Congress were chosen in this election. As this was the first election after the Civil War, many ex-Confederates were barred from voting, and several Southern states did not take part in the election. Delegations from Arkansas, Florida, Alabama, North Carolina, Louisiana, and South Carolina were re-admitted during the 40th Congress. 

President Andrew Johnson held a National Union Convention in hopes of rallying supporters against the Radical Republicans. However, the Republican Party maintained a dominant majority in both houses of Congress, and ultimately impeached Johnson in 1868.

In the House, both parties picked up several seats, but Republicans retained a majority. 

In the Senate, Republicans won massive gains and increased their already-dominant majority, while Democrats suffered slight losses.

See also
1866–67 United States House of Representatives elections
1866–67 United States Senate elections

References

1866 elections in the United States
1866
United States midterm elections